The Corno di Cavento is a mountain in Trentino-Alto Adige, Italy. It is located in the Province of Trento, between Val Rendena and Val di Fumo.

Its summit was conquered for the first time by a young  Bohemian climber, Julius von Payer, along with Coronna, Gries and Hayer, on 3 September 1868.

It was the theater of bitter fighting during World War I; held by Austro-Hungarian troops, it was captured by the Alpini on 15 June 1917, retaken by the Austro-Hungarians exactly a year later, and conquered once again by the Italians on 19 July 1918.

References

Mountains of the Alps
Alpine three-thousanders
Mountains of Trentino